The Ulidiinae are a subfamily of flies in the family Ulidiidae. Like the Otitinae, most species are herbivorous or saprophagous. Most species share with the Tephritidae an unusual elongated projection of the anal cell in the wing, but can be differentiated by the smoothly curving subcostal vein. Most are dull gray to shiny brown or black flies with vein R1 setulose or, in a few cases, bare.

Tribes and genera
Tribe Lipsanini
Acrosticta Loew, 1868
Acrostictomyia Blanchard, 1938
Aspistomella Hendel, 1909
Axiologina Hendel, 1909
Cenchrometopa Hendel, 1909
Chaetopsis Loew, 1868
Euacaina Steyskal, 1963
Eumecosomyia Hendel, 1909
Eumetopiella Hendel, 1907
Euphara Loew, 1868
Euxesta Loew, 1868
Heterodoxa J. R. Malloch, 1832
Hypoecta Loew, 1868
Lipsana Enderlein, 1938
Neoeuxesta J. R. Malloch, 1930
Notogramma Loew, 1868
Paraphyola Hendel, 1909
Pareuxesta Coquillett, 1901
Perissoneura J. R. Malloch, 1832
Polyteloptera Hendel, 1909
Pseudeuxesta Hendel, 1910
Siopa Hendel, 1909
Steneretma
Stenomyia Loew, 1868
Texasa
Ulivellia Speiser, 1929
Vladolinia Kameneva, 2005
Zacompsia Coquillett, 1901
Tribe Pterocallini
Aciuroides Hendel, 1914
Apterocerina Hendel, 1909
Chondrometopum Hendel, 1909
Coscinum Hendel, 1909
Cymatozus Enderlein, 1912
Cyrtomostoma Hendel, 1909
Dasymetopa Loew, 1868
Elapata Hendel, 1909
Goniaeola Hendel, 1909
Lathrostigma Enderlein
Megalaemyia Hendel, 1909
Micropterocerus Hendel, 1914
Neomyennis Hendel, 1914
Ophthalmoptera Hendel, 1909
Paragoniaeola?
Paragorgopis Giglio-Tos, 1893
Parophthalmoptera?
Perissoza?
Plagiocephalus Wiedemann, 1830
Pterocalla Rondani, 1848
Pterocerina Hendel, 1909
Sympaectria Hendel, 1909
Rhyparella Hendel, 1909
Terpnomyennis  Kameneva, 2004
Terpnomyia Hendel, 1909
Tetrapleura Schiner, 1868
Xanthacrona  Wulp, 1899
Tribe Seiopterini
Homalocephala Zetterstedt, 1838
Syn.: Psairoptera
Pseudoseioptera Stackelberg 1955
Seioptera Kirby, 1817
Syn.: Ortalis Fallén, 1810
Tribe Ulidiini
Physiphora Fallén, 1810
Timia Wiedemann, 1824
Ulidia Meigen, 1826

References

 
Ulidiidae
Brachycera subfamilies
Taxa named by Pierre-Justin-Marie Macquart